Faustin Senghor (born 2 January 1994) is a Senegalese professional footballer who plays as a centre-back for Giresunspor.

Professional career
Senghor began his professional career in his native Senegal with Casa Sports. He moved to the Bosnian club Čelik Zenica in 2018 where he made a handful of appearances. He returned to Casa Sports in 2019, and after a couple of seasons helped them win the Senegal FA Cup and Senegalese League Cup. On 29 January 2021, he moved to the Macedonian club Shkupi signing a 2-year contract. After helping Shkupi win the Macedonian First Football League, he transferred to the Turkish club Giresunspor on 6 September 2022.

Honours
Casa Sports
Senegal FA Cup: 2021
Senegalese League Cup: 2021

Shkupi
 Macedonian First Football League: 2021–22

References

External links
 
 

1994 births
Living people
People from Bignona
Senegalese footballers
Casa Sports players
NK Čelik Zenica players
FK Shkupi players
Giresunspor footballers
Senegal Premier League players
Premier League of Bosnia and Herzegovina players
Macedonian First Football League players
Süper Lig players
Association football defenders
Senegalese expatriate footballers
Senegalese expatriates in Bosnia and Herzegovina
Senegalese expatriates in North Macedonia
Senegalese expatriate sportspeople in Turkey
Expatriate footballers in Bosnia and Herzegovina
Expatriate footballers in North Macedonia
Expatriate footballers in Turkey